Neil Robinson  is a retired para table tennis player from the United Kingdom. He participated in seven consecutive Paralympic Games and won team titles with Scott Robertson and James Rawson in both world and European championships.

He was appointed Member of the Most Excellent Order of the British Empire (MBE) in the 2012 New Year Honours for services to disabled sport.

Paralympic career
At the 1992 Barcelona Paralympics, Robinson took silver in the Men's Singles Class 3 and gold in the Men's Teams Class 3 alongside James Rawson and Phillip Evans.

Robinson won the Class 3 individual silver again four years later at the 1996 Atlanta Paralympics, this time taking the bronze in the Class 3 team competition with Rawson.

At the 2000 Sydney Paralympics, Robinson won silver in the Men's Class 3 Team event with Rawson and Stefan Trofan. The same trio retained their silver medal at the 2004 Athens Paralympics, losing in the gold medal match to South Korea.

Robinson competed at the 2008 Beijing Paralympics in the Men's individual Class 3 event without winning a medal; alongside James Rawson he came fourth in the Men's team Class 3, losing the bronze medal match to host nation China.

After retiring from competition, Robinson became a coach for the Paralympics GB table tennis team.

References

Paralympic table tennis players of Great Britain
Welsh male table tennis players
Medalists at the 1992 Summer Paralympics
Medalists at the 1996 Summer Paralympics
Medalists at the 2000 Summer Paralympics
Medalists at the 2004 Summer Paralympics
Living people
Year of birth missing (living people)
Paralympic medalists in table tennis
Paralympic gold medalists for Great Britain
Paralympic silver medalists for Great Britain
Paralympic bronze medalists for Great Britain
Table tennis players at the 1992 Summer Paralympics
Table tennis players at the 1996 Summer Paralympics
Table tennis players at the 2000 Summer Paralympics
Table tennis players at the 2004 Summer Paralympics
Table tennis players at the 2008 Summer Paralympics
Members of the Order of the British Empire